KSCW may refer to:

 KSCW-DT, a television station (channel 12, virtual 33) licensed to serve Wichita, Kansas, United States
 KSCW-LP, a low-power radio station (103.1 FM) licensed to serve Sun City West, Arizona, United States